Boston Musica Viva is a Boston, Massachusetts-based music ensemble founded by its Music Director, Richard Pittman, in 1969 and dedicated to contemporary music.

Composers and compositions
In its 44-year history, Boston Musica Viva has performed more than 600 works by over 250 composers. These include over 150 works written specifically for BMV, over 160 world premieres, and over 75 Boston premieres. Among the composers whose work the ensemble has performed are Pulitzer Prize-winners Ellen Taaffe Zwilich John Harbison, Joseph Schwantner and Steven Stucky.

World premieres
Boston Musica Viva has presented the world premieres of Thea Musgrave’s opera The Mocking-Bird, John Harbison’s A Full Moon in March, Theo Loevendie’s Gassir, the Hero, Martin Brody’s Heart of a Dog, and John Eaton’s Traveling with Gulliver.

Touring
In addition to its Boston concert season, Boston Musica Viva’s touring engagements have taken them to Lincoln Center, the Library of Congress, the Weill Recital Hall at Carnegie Hall, the 92nd Street Y, Tanglewood, the University of California at Berkeley, and the University of Michigan. The ensemble has made eight tours of Europe, making appearances that included the Settembre Musica Festival in Turin, Italy.

Boston Musica Viva has recorded for the  Albany, Neuma, Delos, CRI,  Nonesuch, Newport Classic and Northeastern Records labels.

Boston Musica Viva received an Aaron Copland Fund grant in 1993 and in 2003, the ensemble received the ASCAP/Chamber Music America Award for Adventurous Programming.

Partial list of composers with works premiered or performed by Boston Musica Viva

 John Cage
 Elliott Carter
 Peter Child
 Osvaldo Golijov
Patrick Greene
 John Harbison
 Donald Harris
 Bernard Hoffer
 Shirish Korde
 William Kraft

 Gyorgy Kurtag
 Joyce Mekeel
 Frederic Rzewski
 Gunther Schuller
 Joseph Schwantner
 Ralph Shapey
 Rand Steiger
 Steven Stucky
Andy Vores
 Jörg Widmann

 Chen Yi
 Evan Ziporyn
 Ellen Taaffe Zwilich

Current and former members of Boston Musica Viva

Violin
 Bayla Keyes
 Danielle Maddon
 Cecile Garcia-Moeller
Mary Crowder Hess

Viola
 Willine Thoe
 Katherine Murdock

Cello
 Jan Mueller-Szeraws
 Ronald Thomas
 Bruce Coppock

Contrabass
 Carolyn Davis Fryer

Flute
 John Heiss (1969–74)
 Fenwick Smith
 Renee Krimsier
 Mauricio Garcia
 Alicia DiDonato (2003–2008)
 Ann K. Bobo (2008–present)

Oboe
 Nancy Dimock

Clarinet
 William Kirkley

Bassoon
 Greg Newton

French horn
 Rick Menaul
 Bob Marlatt
 Jean Rife

Trumpet
 Steve Banzaert

Trombone
 Robert Couture

Timpani
 Jeffrey Fischer

Percussion
 Robert Schulz
 Dean Anderson

Piano
 Hugh Hinton
 Geoffrey Burleson
 Bruce Brubaker
 Evelyn Zuckerman

Performers who have appeared with Boston Musica Viva

 Composer, conductor and pianist Rob Kapilow
 Vocalist Dominique Eade
 Mezzo-soprano Janice Felty
 Pianist Randall Hodgkinson
 Mezzo-soprano Pamela Dellal
 Soprano Elizabeth Keusch
 Soprano Emily Thorner

References

External links
Boston Musica Viva web site
Richard Pittman web site

Culture of Boston
Organizations based in Boston
Contemporary classical music ensembles
American classical music groups